Bundaberg Airport  is a regional airport serving Bundaberg, a city in the Australian state of Queensland. The airport is owned and operated by the Bundaberg Regional Council. It is also known as Bundaberg Regional Airport.

The Royal Flying Doctor Service has one of its nine Queensland bases at Bundaberg Airport.

The Bundaberg Regional Council conducted major works on the runway, terminal, carpark and navigation aids in 2009–10 in an attempt to attract services using A320/737 type aircraft.

History
The airport was officially opened on 12 December 1931, by the Minister for Trade and Customs, the Hon. Frank Forde, M.H.R., as a civilian airport. The airport was renamed in 1936 to Hinkler Airport after Bundaberg's famous aviator Bert Hinkler

In February 2022, Bonza announced that the airport would become one of its 17 destinations with the airline planning to fly to Melbourne from Bundaberg

World War II
With the outbreak of World War II, it was decided as part of the Empire Air Training Scheme to requisition Bundaberg Airport and develop it as a Royal Australian Air Force (RAAF) Flying Training School.

Known as RAAF Station Bundaberg it was initially used in 1941 by No. 12 Elementary Flying Training School RAAF (12 EFTS), until 12 EFTS relocated to Lowood Aerodrome (located at Tarampa) on 12 January 1942. No. 8 Service Flying Training School RAAF then operated from the base.

Units Based at Bundaberg
 No. 32 Squadron RAAF ('B' Flight) – 1 May 1943 – 4 September 1944
 No. 66 Squadron RAAF – 20 May 1943 – 6 January 1944
 No. 71 Squadron RAAF ('B' Flight) – 1 May 1942 – 26 January 1943
 No. 8 Service Flying Training School RAAF – 14 December 1941 – 25 July 1945
 No. 12 Elementary Flying Training School RAAF – 16 October 1941 – 12 January 1942
 No. 88 Operational Base Unit RAAF – 14 June 1945 – 26 April 1946
 Royal Netherlands East Indies Army Air Force Personnel & equipment pool – 25 June 1945 – 26 April 1946.

Bundaberg War Graves
Located within the Bundaberg General Cemetery, it contains the burial places of 46 soldiers and airmen of the Australian Forces and five airmen of the United States Army Air Corps.

Post war
The Department of Civil Aviation took over Bundaberg Aerodrome on 31 July 1946. Bundaberg City Council took over the airport in June 1983. A new terminal was opened on 9 May 1986. A major extension to Bundaberg Airport was completed in March 2010, making the runway jet capable and also including an expanded Terminal.

Facilities

Airlines and destinations

Statistics
Bundaberg Airport was ranked 41st in Australia for the number of revenue passengers served in financial year 2010–2011.

See also
 List of airports in Queensland
 Bert Hinkler

References

External links

 RAAF Museum website

1931 establishments in Australia
Airports established in 1931
Airports in Queensland
Buildings and structures in Bundaberg
Bundaberg
Former Royal Australian Air Force bases
Queensland in World War II